Fear of God was an American metal band from Los Angeles, formed in 1991 by members of thrash metal band Detente, including vocalist Dawn Crosby. Following Crosby's death in 1996, the band continued to perform and record under the name Fog.

Discography
Within the Veil (1991) 
Toxic Voodoo (1994) 
Killing the Pain EP (1995)

External links
Official website
[ Biography] by Vincent Jeffries at AllMusic
Dawn Crosby Facebook fan page with every photo and video that had been available online

Musical groups established in 1991
Musical groups from Los Angeles
Heavy metal musical groups from California
1991 establishments in California